The Missing Husband is an upcoming Philippine television drama mystery series to be broadcast by GMA Network. Directed by Mark A. Reyes, it stars Rocco Nacino in the title role and Yasmien Kurdi. It is set to premiere in 2023, on the network's Afternoon Prime lineup.

Premise
A husband who is dealing with financial problems, goes missing. His wife searches for him and will eventually discover information that will challenge their marriage, when she finds out that his husband vanished on purpose.

Cast and characters
Lead cast
 Rocco Nacino as Anton
 Yasmien Kurdi as Millie

Supporting cast
 Nadine Samonte
 Jak Roberto as Joed
 Joross Gamboa as Brendan
 Sophie Albert as Ria
 Bryce Eusebio as Norman
 Michael Flores as Banong
 Max Eigenmann as Leila
 Shamaine Buencamino as Sharon
 Cai Cortez as Glenndolyn "Glenn"

Production
Principal photography commenced in February 2023.

References

Filipino-language television shows
GMA Network drama series
Philippine mystery television series
Television shows set in the Philippines
Upcoming drama television series